List of Bangladeshi inventions and discoveries, only those made since 26 March 1971 when independent Bangladesh came into existence, which owe their existence either partially or entirely to a person born in Bangladesh. Do not add discoveries made before 26 March 1971.  See also misappropriation.

As per the established Wikipedia conventions and policies, place the discoveries and invention made prior to the 26 March 1971 as follows:
 before 15 August 1947, add only to list of Indian inventions and discoveries.
 between 15 August 1947 to 26 March 1971, add only to list of Pakistani inventions and discoveries.

Inventions and improvements 
The following is a list of inventions, innovations or discoveries known or generally recognized to be Bangladeshi.

See also
 Invention
 Patent

References

 
Bangladeshi
Inventions and discoveries